Vojčice is a village and municipality in the Trebišov District in the Košice Region of south-eastern Slovakia.

History
In historical records the village was first mentioned in 1217.

Geography
The village lies at an altitude of 111 metres and covers an area of 17.896 km².
It has a population of about 2075 people.

Ethnicity
The village is about 97% Slovak.

Facilities
The village has a public library a gym and a football pitch. It also has a cinema.

Notable natives
Lya De Putti, film actress

External links
http://www.statistics.sk/mosmis/eng/run.html

Villages and municipalities in Trebišov District